The Meilahti Campus is a campus area of the University of Helsinki in Finland. It houses the Faculty of Medicine and many medical research institutions. Several hospitals are also concentrated in the area.

See also 
 City Centre Campus
 Kumpula Campus
 University of Helsinki
 Viikki Campus

Buildings and structures in Helsinki
University of Helsinki
Meilahti
Ruskeasuo
University and college campuses in Finland